The Virtual University of Pakistan (VU) is a public university with its headquarters in M.A Jinnah Campus, Defence Road, Off Raiwind Road Lahore, Punjab, Pakistan. It mainly focuses on providing distant learning programs through utilization of Information and Communication Technology (ICT) tools.

Overview
Virtual University was established in 2002 by the Government of Pakistan to promote distance education. It is recognized by the Higher Education Commission (Pakistan) and holds highest category 'W' by HEC.  The Virtual University of Pakistan also holds a Federal Charter. It is Pakistan's first university based on completely modern Information and Communication Technologies (ICT) and evolving their mode of education by using Artificial Intelligence, Blockchain, Virtual Reality, and Metaverse technologies. It is a future-oriented university in Pakistan and progressing gradually. The university offers undergraduate, post-graduate and doctorate courses in various disciplines. Due to its heavy reliance on serving lectures through the internet, Pakistani students abroad are also enrolled in the university's programs.

Virtual University directs and records the lectures of the top renowned national and international professors, assistant professors, and lecturers (Adjunct Faculty) who are highly skilled, field experts and have practical experience in the relevant domain at their virtual reality studio.

Academic degrees
VU offers following degree programs:

Bachelor's Programs (4-Years)
 BS Computer Science
 BS Information Technology
 BS Software Engineering
 BS Business Administration 
 BS Commerce
 BS Public Administration
 Bachelor of Business and Information Technology (BBIT)
 BS Management
 BS Marketing
 BS Mass Communication
 BS Psychology
 BS Economics
 BS Sociology
 BS English (Applied Linguistics)
 BS Accounting and Finance
 BS Banking and Finance
 BS Mathematics
 BS Bioinformatics
 BS Biotechnology
 BS Zoology
 B.Ed. (Hons.) Elementary
 B.Ed. (Hons.) Early Childhood Care and Education

Bachelor's Programs (2-Years) - Discontinued by HEC Pakistan
 BA
 BA (Mass communication)
 BA (Psychology)
 B.Sc. (Computer Science)
 B.Com.
 B.Ed. (Elementary)
 BA (Business Administration)
 BA (Mathematics, Statistics and Economics)
 BA (Supply Chain Management)

Associate Degree Program (ADP 2-Year)
 Computer Networking
 Database Management System
 Web design and Development
 Computer Science
 Accounting and Finance
 Islamic Banking
 Human Resources management 
 Operations Management 
 Sales and Marketing 
 Supply Chain Management

Master's Programs (MA/MSc 2-Years) - Discontinued by HEC Pakistan
 M.Sc. Statistics
 Master of Computer Science (MCS)
 Master of Information Technology (MIT)
 Master of Business Administration (MBA)-Executive
 M.Sc. Applied Psychology
 M.Sc. Economics
 M.Sc. Organizational Psychology
 M.Sc. Mass Communication
 M.Sc. Mathematics
 M.A. English Language Teaching (ELT)
 Master of Commerce (M.Com.)
 Master of Public Administration (MPA)
 Master of Business Economics (MBEcon)
 Master of Accounting
 Master of Finance
 Master of Accounting and Finance
 Master of Banking and Finance
 Master of Human Resources Management (MHRM)
 Master of Operation and Supply Chain Management

Master's Programs (MS/MPhil 2-Years)
 MS Computer Science
 MS Mathematics
 MSBA/MBA
 MS Bioinformatics
 MS Biotechnology
 MS Genetics
 MS Molecular Biology
 MS Zoology
 M.Phil in Education (Educational Leadership and Management)

Doctoral Programs
 Ph.D in Computer Science
 Ph.D in Biotechnology

Certifications
 Artificial Intelligence
 Computer Science
 Software Engineering
 Information Technology
 Accounting, Banking & Finance
 Economics
 English
 Humanities Distribution
 Law
 Management
 Marketing
 Mass Communication
 Mathematics
 Physics
 Probability & Statistics
 Psychology
 Sociology

Campuses
Virtual University has two types of campuses. The first ones are its own campuses which are called its offices. Its head office is located in Lahore. Second ones are called private virtual campuses (PVC) and run by the private organizations (more commonly known as affiliated campuses). Virtual University has more than 190+ campuses all around Pakistan and students can use the facilities of campuses i.e. internet, computers, premises and library to carry their educational activities.

Distant teaching method
Virtual University is one of two Pakistani universities which provide distance education (the first one is Allama Iqbal Open University). Virtual University provides quality education to its students and is equipped with the latest technologies to track the progress of each students. Students can get lectures through its AI based Learning Management System (LMS), YouTube channel, and online student-teacher interactive sessions.

Learning and evaluation method
The students are conventionally evaluated each semester through physical appearance in their Practicals, Mid and Final term exams at university campuses, and remaining activities i.e. assignments, quizzes, viva, presentations and graded discussions are conducted through AI based Learning Management System (LMS), and online (live) assessment sessions. Virtual University has transparent and highest-quality standards assessment schemes that are more strict, secure and difficult than other conventional universities.

Board of Governors 
The constitution of the Board of Governors as defined in the Virtual University Ordinance 2002 is as follows:

Milestones 
 First batch of 500 students starts classes. March 26, 2002
 Federal Charter granted by Government of Pakistan. September 1, 2002
 VU start broadcasts over its own TV channels VTV1 and VTV2. June 15, 2004
 VU selected as coordinating institute of multi-country IDRC funded project. March 1, 2005
 VU upload its lectures on YouTube November, 2005
 Launch of MCS, MIT and MBA programs. March 6, 2006
 University adds 2 more channels to its Television Network VUTV 3 & VUTV 4. September 26, 2006
 VU becomes an Asia Pacific Broadcasting Union (ABU) member. November 7, 2006
 VU agreement with Ujala TV Dubai to telecast VU programs. November 30, 2006.
 VU agreement with the University of Veterinary and Animal Sciences to offer joint BS Bio-informatics program. May 25, 2007
 Launch of MS program in Computer Science. Fall 2007
 Launch of a unique VU e-Examination System. August 25, 2008
 Launch of B.A., B.Com., B.Sc. (2-year programs). Fall 2009
 Enrollment exceeds 50,000 students. September 30, 2009
 VU launches its in-house developed LMS (Learning Management System) and other MIS(s) by IT Department. Spring 2009
 The Virtual University of Pakistan held its first Convocation on Tuesday 18 May 2010 simultaneously at Peshawar,  Rawalpindi, Lahore, Jamshoro, Karachi and Quetta.
 Launch of VU Open Courseware website. October 15, 2011
 VU Open Courseware website declared best website of the year.  April 10, 2012
 Deployment of VU Examination Software to NUST for conduct of Entry Test.  June 02, 2012
 Student enrollment crosses 100,000 mark.   October 30, 2012
 VU offers its educational resources to other universities free of cost.   November 20, 2012
 VU partners with University of the Punjab and Technical University Kaiserslautern, Germany to launch B.Ed. in Technical Education.    September 10, 2014
 Deployment of VU Learning Management System (VULMS) to Concordia Colleges.     September 12, 2014
 University starts Degree Programs in Life Sciences.      Fall 2014
 Launch of VU Journal.     September 20, 2014
 Launch of Global Languages website.      November 20, 2014
 Initiation of Ph.D. Programs.       Fall 2015
 The Virtual University of Pakistan holds Highest Category 'W' By HEC.
 HEC on May 28, 2013, has clarified the ambiguity created by some newspapers amongst VU students and the general public. HEC has, therefore, reconfirmed the status of the university as an online and distance education institution of the country.

References

Distance education institutions based in Pakistan
Educational institutions established in 2002
Universities and colleges in Lahore
Public universities and colleges in Pakistan
2002 establishments in Pakistan